Mineola Union Free School District is a public school district based in Mineola, New York, United States.

History 

The original high school opened in 1927, and was replaced by the current one in 1962. The old high school is now Mineola Middle School.

Area served

Location and area

The Mineola Union Free School District serves parts of the following communities:
Mineola
Garden City Park
Williston Park
Albertson
 Roslyn Heights

Schools 
The Mineola Union Free School District contains the following schools:

High School (Grades 8-12)

 Mineola High School

Mineola Middle School (Grades 5-7)

 Mineola Middle School

Elementary schools

 Hampton Street School (Pre-K - Grade 2)
 Jackson Avenue School (Grades 3 & 4)
 Meadow Drive School (Pre-K - Grade 2)

See also
List of school districts in New York

References

External links
http://www.mineola.k12.ny.us/

School districts in New York (state)
Education in Nassau County, New York